Maginus is an ancient lunar impact crater located in the southern highlands to the southeast of the prominent crater Tycho. It is a large formation almost three quarters the diameter of Clavius, which lies to the southwest. Just to the north of Maginus is the smaller crater Proctor, and to the southeast is Deluc.

The rim of Maginus is heavily eroded, with impact-formed incisions, and multiple overlapping craters across the eastern side. The wall is broken through in the southeast by Maginus C, a worn crater. Little remains of the original features that formed the rim of Maginus, and it no longer possesses an outer rampart. The floor is relatively flat, with a pair of low central peaks.

Satellite craters
By convention these features are identified on lunar maps by placing the letter on the side of the crater midpoint that is closest to Maginus.

References
 

 
 
 
 
 
 
 
 
 
 
 
 

Impact craters on the Moon